Bromodiphenylmethane or 1,1'-(bromomethanediyl)dibenzene, is an organobromine compound with the chemical formula .

Organobromides